Potamarcha is a genus of dragonfly in the family Libellulidae. 
Species of Potamarcha are medium sized dragonflies
found in southern Asia and Australia.
Potamarcha was first described by Ferdinand Karsch in 1890.

Species
The genus Potamarcha includes two species:.

References

Libellulidae
Anisoptera genera
Odonata of Asia
Odonata of Australia
Taxa named by Ferdinand Karsch
Insects described in 1890